The Barauni–Lucknow Express is an Express train belonging to East Central Railway zone that runs between  and  in India. It is currently being operated with 15203/15204 train numbers on a daily basis.

Service

The 15203/Barauni–Lucknow Express has an average speed of 41 km/h and covers 673 km in 16h 30m. The 15204/Lucknow–Barauni Express has an average speed of 40 km/h and covers 487 km in 17h.

Route and halts 

The important halts of the train are:

Coach composition

The train has standard ICF rakes with a max speed of 110 km/h. The train consists of 16 coaches:

 1 First AC 
 1 AC II Tier
 1 AC III Tier
 5 Sleeper coaches
 6 General Unreserved
 2 Seating cum Luggage Rake

Traction

Both trains are hauled by a Mughalsarai-based WAP-4 electric locomotive from Barauni to Lucknow and vice versa.

Rake sharing

The train shares its rake with 15205/15206 Chitrakoot Express

See also 

 Lucknow Junction railway station
 Barauni Junction railway station
 Chitrakoot Express

Notes

References

External links 

 15203/Barauni - Lucknow Express
 15204/Lucknow - Barauni Express

Passenger trains originating from Lucknow
Express trains in India
Rail transport in Bihar